Dolon Nor (Doloon nuur, seven lakes; also: To-lun, Dolonnur), is a town and the county seat of Duolun County, Xilin Gol League in the Inner Mongolia Autonomous region, China. It is of historical importance because the remnants of Shangdu, the summer capital of Kublai Khan and the following Mongol emperors of the Yuan dynasty (13th and 14th century), are located some 28 kilometers (17 miles) northwest of the modern town. Beginning in the 17th century, the Manchu emperors of the Qing dynasty developed the city as a religious center.

In the Encyclopædia Britannica Eleventh Edition (1911), the city is described as follows:

Another, longer description of the city is in writings of Évariste Huc (1813–1860), a Frenchman who stayed there in 1845 on his way to Lhasa (which he reached after 18 months of travelling).

In 1933, the town was the object of fighting between the Japanese and their Manchukuoan puppet troops and the Chahar People's Anti-Japanese Army.

See also
 Actions in Inner Mongolia (1933–36)

References

Populated places in Inner Mongolia